Schizovalva polygramma is a moth of the family Gelechiidae. It was described by Edward Meyrick in 1914. It is found in South Africa.

The wingspan is 20–23 mm. The forewings are purplish fuscous mixed with dark fuscous and blackish. The costal edge and all the veins are marked with ochreous-whitish lines. The hindwings are light ochreous grey.

References

Endemic moths of South Africa
Moths described in 1914
Schizovalva